Coelorhyncidia is a genus of moths of the family Crambidae.

Species
Coelorhyncidia elathealis (Walker, 1859)
Coelorhyncidia flammealis Hampson, 1917
Coelorhyncidia nitidalis Hampson, 1907
Coelorhyncidia ovulalis Hampson, 1896
Coelorhyncidia purpurea Hampson, 1907
Coelorhyncidia trifidalis Hampson, 1897

References

Spilomelinae
Crambidae genera
Taxa named by George Hampson